Wells is an unincorporated community in the town of Rantoul, Calumet County and the town of Rockland, Manitowoc County, Wisconsin, United States.

History
Wells was founded in the 1880s. The first store owner, Claus Meinke, became the postmaster for the community's post office in 1894.

Images

References

Unincorporated communities in Calumet County, Wisconsin
Unincorporated communities in Manitowoc County, Wisconsin
Unincorporated communities in Wisconsin